Haavisto  is a Finnish surname, most prevalent in Satakunta. Notable people with the surname include:

 Arvo Haavisto (1900–1977), Finnish wrestler
 Jukka Haavisto (born 1930), Finnish songwriter and entrepreneur
 Heikki Haavisto (born 1935), Finnish politician
 Kari Haavisto (born 1941), Finnish Olympic swimmer
 Olli Haavisto (born 1954), Finnish guitarist
 Susanna Haavisto (born 1957), Finnish actress and singer
 Pekka Haavisto (born 1958), Finnish politician
 Janne Haavisto (born 1964), Finnish drummer
 Jani Haavisto (born 1987), Finnish darts player

Finnish-language surnames
Surnames of Finnish origin